Snake Creek Bridge is a bascule bridge in the village of Islamorada in the Florida Keys.  The single-leaf steel bascule bridge carries the Overseas Highway (U.S. 1) over Snake Creek, connecting Plantation Key and Windley Key.  It is located near mile marker 86.

The bridge was completed in 1981 when a number of new bridges were being built to modernize the Overseas Highway.  It is the third bridge that has existed at this location.  The first bridge, which carried the Overseas Railroad, was built in the early 1900s.  A second bridge built in the 1920s next to the railroad bridge carried the first Overseas Highway (State Road 4A), though the highway would later be shifted to railroad bridge in the 1940s, which was retrofitted for automobile use.

The Snake Creek Bridge is notable for being the only remaining drawbridge operating in the Florida Keys.  It gained this distinction in the late 2000s, when the Overseas Highway's drawbridge over Jewfish Creek was replaced by the current Jewfish Creek Bridge in 2008, and the closure and abandonment of the Boot Key Harbor drawbridge in Marathon in 2009.

See also

References

External links

U.S. Route 1
Bridges completed in 1981
Bridges in Monroe County, Florida
Bridges of the United States Numbered Highway System
Road bridges in Florida
1981 establishments in Florida
Bascule bridges in the United States